The 2022–23 FA Women's League Cup was the twelfth edition of the Women's Super League and Women's Championship's league cup competition. It was sponsored by Continental AG, who have sponsored the competition since its creation in 2011, and was officially known as the FA Women's Continental Tyres League Cup for sponsorship reasons. All 24 teams from the WSL and Championship contested the competition. Manchester City were the defending champions.

Format
The competition kept the same format as the previous season, starting with a group stage split regionally. Teams competing in the UEFA Women's Champions League group stage are exempt from the League Cup group stage, earning a provisional bye to the quarter-finals. As a result, the initial group stage draw made on 9 August 2022 featured 21 of the 24 teams: one Northern group had five teams drawn into it with the remaining Northern group and all three Southern groups initially featuring four teams each. The three teams excluded from the draw were Chelsea, who automatically entered the Champions League group stage and therefore joined the League Cup at the quarter-final stage, and Manchester City and Arsenal who will take part in the Champions League qualifying rounds. Should either team be eliminated during qualification, they would enter the League Cup group stage and be drawn into an existing group of four in their geographical region. Manchester City were eliminated from the Champions League in the first qualifying round and were therefore placed in Group B as the only Northern group with four teams.

The first place team in each of the five groups will qualify for the knock-out stage. Because Manchester City failed to progress from Champions League qualifying, one best-placed runner-up will also progress to make up eight teams in the quarter-finals.

Group stage

Group A

Group B

Group C

Group D

Group E

Ranking of second-placed teams
Due to Manchester City's failure to progress from Champions League qualifying, they entered the League Cup group stage. With only two teams receiving byes to the League Cup quarter-finals, the best-placed runner-up team progressed with the five group winners to make up the final eight. With the three Southern groups containing one fewer team than the two Northern groups, the ranking to determine which second-placed team progressed was calculated on a points-per-game basis.

Knock-out stage

Quarter-finals
Chelsea and Arsenal will enter the League Cup at the quarter-final stage having been exempt from the League Cup group stage due to their participation in the Champions League group stage.

Semi-finals

Final

On 5 December 2022, it was announced that the 2023 FA Women's League Cup Final would be held at Selhurst Park, the home of Crystal Palace, for the first time. The final took place on 5 March 2023.

See also
2022–23 Women's Super League
2022–23 Women's Championship

Notes

References

External links
Official website

FA Women's League Cup
Cup